The Super heavyweight competition was the heaviest class featured at the 2011 World Amateur Boxing Championships, held at the Heydar Aliyev Sports and Exhibition Complex. Boxers were not limited to a maximum kilograms in body mass.

Medalists

Seeds

  Roberto Cammarelle (quarterfinals)
  Magomedrasul Majidov (champion)
  Filip Hrgovic (quarterfinals)
  Viktar Zuyev (quarterfinals)
  Roman Kapitonenko (third round)
  Zhang Zhilei (third round)
  Tony Yoka (third round)
  Juan Hiracheta (second round)
  Mohamed Arjaoui (third round)
  Erislandy Savon (quarterfinals)

Draw

Finals

Top half

Section 1

Section 2

Bottom half

Section 3

Section 4

External links
Draw

Super heavyweight